Thomas Tuschl (born 1 June 1966) is a German biochemist and molecular biologist, known for his research on RNA.

Biography
Tuschl was born in Altdorf bei Nürnberg. After graduating in Chemistry from Regensburg University, Tuschl received his PhD in 1995 from the Max Planck Institute for Experimental Medicine in Göttingen. He spent four years as a post-doctoral fellow at the Whitehead Institute of the Massachusetts Institute of Technology (MIT) in Cambridge, USA.

In 1999 he returned to Göttingen, to continue his research at the Max Planck Institute for Biophysical Chemistry. There he received international recognition in Genetics for his studies of RNA interference in collaboration with the laboratory of Klaus Weber. This enables "switching off" certain genes by introducing synthetic short RNA into the cell. The mRNA is destroyed and the gene in deactivated. Possible future applications of this method include treatment of tumors or genetic disorders. The function of certain genes can be studied more easily. RNA interference is a major step in genetics.
  
In 2003 Tuschl became professor and head of laboratory at Rockefeller University in New York, where he continues his research. He is looking into microRNA, small RNA-sections, which are formed by the cells and cause RNA interference like introduced synthetic RNA-strains.

In 2006, two of Tuschl's fellow researchers, Andrew Z. Fire and Craig C. Mello, received the Nobel Prize in Physiology or Medicine for their discovery of "RNA interference – gene silencing by double-stranded RNA".

Awards
Tuschl received several national and international awards for his work:

 2008: Ernst Jung Prize
 2007: Max Delbrück Medal, Berlin
 2005: Ernst Schering Prize, Berlin
 2005:	Meyenburg Prize, Heidelberg
 2005:  Dr. Albert Wander Gedenk Prize, Bern, Schweiz
 2003:	Mayor's Award for Excellence in Science and Technology, New York, USA
 2003:	Co-recipient (with Craig Mello, Andrew Fire and David Baulcombe) of the Wiley Prize in the Biomedical Sciences, The Wiley Foundation, USA
 2003:	Newcomb Cleveland Prize, American Association for the Advancement of Science, USA
 2002:	Eppendorf Young Investigator Award, Hamburg
 2002:	Otto-Klung-Weberbank-Preis for Chemistry and Physics, Berlin

References

External links
 
 Interview with Thomas Tuschl in sciencegarden

1966 births
Living people
German biochemists
German molecular biologists
Howard Hughes Medical Investigators
Rockefeller University faculty
People from Altdorf bei Nürnberg